Giri 'Pickbrain' Balasubramaniam is the founder and chief executive officer of Greycaps, India's largest on stage quizzing and knowledge service provider . He is nicknamed Pickbrain.

Early life and career 

Giri has an MBA in Media Management and a master's degree in Gandhian Philosophy and Thought. Giri is alumnus of Harvard Business School (2017). He is a distinguished student from Baldwin Boys' High School, Bangalore.

A little known fact about Giri is during his early years was a passionate cricketer who captained his college side. He was also the wicket keeper for a first division club in Bangalore named Young Cricketers. He kept wickets for the great spinner Anil Kumble as they played for the same club as youngsters.

Giri started his career in 1992, with The Economic Times, and was later part of the team responsible for successful relaunch of The Bangalore Edition of the Times of India in 1996. He then worked with Walt Disney group for three years before serving as the youngest Vice-President in-charge of Content and Strategy for Indiainfo.

Thereafter, he founded Quizbrain.com, in 1999 and later launched his own company Greycaps India Pvt. Ltd.

Work 
Giri is a noted quizmaster and author of several quiz books. He is also the mind behind the Global Awareness Program (GAP) one of India’s first focused, structured knowledge enhancement programs for school children and Knowledge‐Hub & Global Business Review for management students. He has pioneered a program on Values Education in schools called "Keystones". Over 25,00,000 children have been part of these programs. He and his team have presented close to 3000 shows across 94 destinations of India, Sri Lanka, Oman, Singapore, United Kingdom, Kuwait, Japan, UAE and United States to emerge as one of the fastest growing quiz hosts from the region.

He is a regular guest speaker and advisory panel member at several B‐schools, educational institutions and corporate houses in India. During his visits to Muscat and Kuwait he has been invited regularly by leading schools in that country to address their students.

In 2007, as recognition of his growing popularity and contribution to learning and development Times of India identified him amongst "Potential Future Leaders of India" as part of its Lead India Initiative. Dewang Mehta had once remarked about him ”We are moving into an era where education and knowledge will carry great value and people like Pickbrain will be the icons of that generation."

He has been working with Tata Consultancy Services since 1998 and is the quizmaster of their national quiz TCS IT Wiz, claimed to be India's biggest inter-school IT Quiz. Since 2022, this quiz has been renamed TCS InQuizitive. He is also the quiz master of Tata Crucible, organised by Tata Sons in India, UK, Singapore and UAE.

In 2021, he made his debut in films with the Tamil film Kamali from Nadukkaveri. He plays himself in the film. The film stars Rohit Saraf and Anandhi along with veteran actor Prathap Pothen. The movie has been highly rated and appreciated by the audience as a motivational film and a film that addresses woman empowerment.

Quizography

Awards 
Nominated the Global Innovator Award 2005‐06 by Massachusetts Institute of Technology, United States
 Recipient of seven Limca Book of Records for quizzing achievements
Nominated for an Internet Oscar in 2001 at the Asian Internet Awards, Singapore
CM Asia Award 2004 and 2005
Nomination to the Dewang Mehta Award given by the Ministry Of Information Technology, Government of India

References 

Quiz games